The Church of Saint Paraskeva Pyatnitsa (also known as Military Cossack Cathedral) is a Russian Orthodox church in Manychskaya village, Bagayevsky District, Rostov Oblast, Russia. It belongs to the Diocese of Shakhty of Russian Orthodox Church. It was built in 1904 on the project of architect Ilya Zlobin. It is also officially declared as an object of cultural heritage of Russia.

History 
The first mention of the Church in the name of the Great Martyr Paraskeva refers to 1748. This church later became dilapidated, so it was rebuilt and reconsecrated in 1763. From 1801 to 1805, the church was dismantled, moved to a new place and rebuilt. Since 1862, the church had a parochial school.

A new stone Church of Saint Paraskeva Pyatnitsa was laid in 1878 (according to other sources, its construction began in 1893 or in 1897). In 1904, construction works were finished and the church was consecrated.

In 1934, the church was looted but had not been officially closed until 1936. Yet during World War II it continued to function for some time. During the war the church building served as a bomb shelter. In after-war years, it was used as a granary. The bell tower was dismantled and its bricks were used as construction material during Nikita Khrushchev rule.

In 1990, the church building was given to Russian Orthodox Church. Religious services are held there since 1992. In 2001, the church was renovated.

References

Churches in Rostov Oblast
Cultural heritage monuments of regional significance in Rostov Oblast
Russian Orthodox church buildings in Russia